Patrick Robeet (born 10 October 1964) is a former Belgian racing cyclist. He rode in the 1989 and the 1990 Tour de France.

References

External links

1964 births
Living people
Belgian male cyclists
Sportspeople from Leuven
Cyclists from Flemish Brabant
20th-century Belgian people
21st-century Belgian people